This is a list of the National Register of Historic Places listings in Camp County, Texas.

This is intended to be a complete list of properties and districts listed on the National Register of Historic Places in Camp County, Texas. There is one district listed in the county. This district also contains Recorded Texas Historic Landmarks.

Current listing

The locations of National Register properties and districts may be seen in a mapping service provided.

|}

See also

National Register of Historic Places listings in Texas
Recorded Texas Historic Landmarks in Camp County

References

External links

Registered Historic Places
Camp County
Buildings and structures in Camp County, Texas